Rapture: The Second Coming is a role-playing game published by Quintessential Mercy Studio in 1995, with a second edition by Holistic Design in 2002.

Description
Rapture: The Second Coming is a post-apocalyptic religious role-playing game.

Publication history
Rapture: The Second Coming was written by William Spencer-Hale and published by Quintessential Mercy Studio in 1995.

Andrew Greenberg produced the new d20 edition of Rapture: The Second Coming for Holistic Design in 2002.

Reception

Reviews
Pyramid #19 (May/June, 1996)

References

D20 System publications
Holistic Design games
Post-apocalyptic role-playing games
Role-playing games introduced in 1995